Blyth's swift (Apus leuconyx), is a small bird, superficially similar to a house martin. It is, however, completely unrelated to those passerine species, since swifts are in the order Apodiformes. The resemblances between the groups are due to convergent evolution reflecting similar life styles.

These birds have very short legs which they use only for clinging to vertical surfaces. The scientific name comes from the Greek απους, apous, meaning "without feet". They never settle voluntarily on the ground. Blyth's swifts spend most of their lives in the air, living on the insects they catch in their beaks.

Blyth's swifts breeds from the outer Himalayas through the Assam hills. This species is migratory, and winters in India and Sri Lanka.  A 2011 study has many taxonomists splitting this species from the fork-tailed swift complex.

These swifts build their nests on cliffs, laying 2–3 eggs. A swift will return to the same site year after year, rebuilding its nest when necessary.

Blyth's swifts are similar in size to common swift, and they are black except for a white rump. They can be distinguished from a partially leucistic common swift by the deeper tail fork, longer wings, bigger head and larger white throat patch.

The common name commemorates Edward Blyth (1810–1873), English zoologist and Curator of the Museum of the Asiatic Society of Bengal.

References

Blyth's swift
Birds of Northeast India
Blyth's swift
Blyth's swift